Juan Manuel Insaurralde (born October 3, 1984) is an Argentine professional footballer who plays for Sarmiento as a defender.

Club career
Insaurralde made his competitive debut for Chacarita Juniors against Newell's Old Boys, the game was won by Newell's 2–1. After Chacarita were relegated he stayed with the club until 2008, when he was signed by Newell's.

National team
On September 24, 2009 Insaurralde was called up by Argentine national team's coach Diego Maradona for a friendly match against Ghana.

Honours
Boca Juniors

 Copa Argentina: 2011–12
Primera División (3): 2011 Apertura, 2016–17, 2017–18

References

External links

 
 Juan Manuel Insaurralde – Argentine Primera statistics at Fútbol XXI 
 
 Insaurralde, Juan Manuel at Historia de Boca.com 

1984 births
Living people
People from Resistencia, Chaco
Argentine footballers
Argentine expatriate footballers
Argentina international footballers
Association football central defenders
Argentine Primera División players
Russian Premier League players
Super League Greece players
Liga MX players
Chacarita Juniors footballers
Newell's Old Boys footballers
Boca Juniors footballers
Colo-Colo footballers
Chilean Primera División players
FC Spartak Moscow players
PAOK FC players
Chiapas F.C. footballers
Expatriate footballers in Chile
Expatriate footballers in Russia
Expatriate footballers in Greece
Expatriate footballers in Mexico
Argentine expatriate sportspeople in Chile
Argentine expatriate sportspeople in Mexico
Argentine expatriate sportspeople in Greece
Argentine expatriate sportspeople in Russia
Sportspeople from Chaco Province